Hacıahmetli  is a village in Mut district of  Mersin Province, Turkey. The village is situated in Toros Mountains. The population of the village was 460  as of 2012. The foundation date of the village is not known. According to the Ottoman records of 1536, there was a nomadic Turkmen tribe (so called Yörük) around Hacıahmetli. But according to grave stones, the first settlement was around the early 1700s.

References

Villages in Mut District